AALBC.com, the African American Literature Book Club, is a website dedicated to books and film by and about African Americans and people of African descent, with content also aimed at African-American bookstores. AALBC.com publishes book and film reviews, author profiles, resources for writers and related articles. Launched in 1998, AALBC was founded by Troy Johnson. It targets primarily a middle-aged African-American female demographic.  AALBC previously sold books through the Amazon.com affiliate program, and then started to operate its own warehousing and distribution program.

See also
 African-American literature
 List of African-American writers

References

External links
 Official website
 Appearances by Troy Johnson on C-SPAN

American literature websites
African-American organizations
Internet properties established in 1998